The 20th Annual Tony Awards was broadcast on June 16, 1966, from the Rainbow Room at Rockefeller Center on radio station WCBS. This was the first afternoon Tony Awards ceremony. The Masters of Ceremonies were George Abbott and Ginger Rogers. The ceremony was sponsored by the League of New York Theatres in conjunction with the American Theatre Wing, which had previously solely arranged the ceremony.

The ceremony
Presenters: Lauren Bacall, Herschel Bernardi, Sandy Dennis, Henry Fonda, Phil Ford, Mimi Hines, Ray Milland, Barry Nelson, Mike Nichols, Thelma Oliver, April Olrich, Maureen O'Sullivan, Neil Simon

Music was by Meyer Davis and his Orchestra.

Award winners and nominees
Winners are in bold

Special awards
Helen Menken (posthumous), for a lifetime of devotion and dedicated service to the Broadway theatre.

Multiple nominations and awards

These productions had multiple nominations:

9 nominations: Sweet Charity 
8 nominations: Mame  
7 nominations: Man of La Mancha 
5 nominations: Marat/Sade, Philadelphia, Here I Come! and Skyscraper   
3 nominations: It's a Bird... It's a Plane... It's Superman, On a Clear Day You Can See Forever and Pickwick  
2 nominations: Cactus Flower, Inadmissible Evidence, The Lion in Winter, The Right Honourable Gentleman and Slapstick Tragedy  

The following productions received multiple awards.

5 wins: Man of La Mancha 
4 wins: Marat/Sade   
3 wins: Mame

References

External links
Tony Awards official site

Tony Awards ceremonies
1966 in theatre
1966 awards in the United States
June 1966 events in the United States
1966 in New York City